is a subway station in the Nihonbashi district of Tokyo, Japan, jointly operated by Tokyo Metropolitan Bureau of Transportation (Toei) and Tokyo Metro.

Lines
Nihombashi Station is served by the following lines.

Station layout
The Ginza Line station originally opened as an island platform serving two tracks, but overcrowding prompted the construction of a side platform serving Shibuya-bound trains in 1984. The island platform currently serves only Asakusa-bound trains, and the Shibuya side of the platform is fenced off.

The Tōzai Line station consists of an island platform serving two tracks, while the Asakusa Line station consists of two side platforms with two tracks between them. At the Asakusa line station, passengers must choose their direction before passing through the ticket gates.

Tokyo Metro platforms

The Japanese folk song "Oedo Nihonbashi" (お江戸日本橋, Oedo Nihonbashi) is used as the departure melody for the Tōzai Line platforms in 2015 and the Ginza Line platforms in 2018.

Toei Subway platforms

History
The Tokyo Underground Railway (which built the Asakusa-Shimbashi section of the Ginza Line) opened a station here on December 24, 1932, when they extended the line south to Kyōbashi. On September 1, 1941, they merged with the Tokyo Rapid Railway to form the Teito Rapid Transit Authority (TRTA).

The next development was the opening of Edobashi Station on February 28, 1963, when Toei Line 1 was extended to Higashi-Ginza. Transfer was allowed between the two lines here, but the complex only became a true interchange when the Tōzai Line station opened on September 14, 1967.

Toei Line 1 only received its name – the Asakusa Line – on July 1, 1978, and Edobashi station was renamed on March 19, 1989, to avoid confusion with Edogawabashi Station on the Yūrakuchō Line, which opened in 1974.

The station facilities of the Ginza and Tozai lines were inherited by Tokyo Metro after the privatization of the Teito Rapid Transit Authority (TRTA) in 2004.

See also
 List of railway stations in Japan

References

External links
  
Tokyo Metro station information
Toei transportation station information

Railway stations in Tokyo
Stations of Tokyo Metro
Tokyo Metro Tozai Line
Tokyo Metro Ginza Line
Railway stations in Japan opened in 1932
Nihonbashi, Tokyo